A groundhog is a small mammal (Marmota monax). 

Groundhog may also refer to:
 Groundhog (comics), a fictional character
 The Groundhogs, a musical group
 "Groundhog", a song written by Paul Simon

See also
 Groundhog Day (disambiguation)